Matt Baker is a British television screenwriter, best known for creating the period television series Hotel Portofino.

Career
Prior to television, Baker had a career as a journalist, working for ViacomCBS. When the COVID-19 pandemic began, Baker used lockdowns to make a career change and focus on writing, a life-long passion.

Baker's first broadcast credit was helming the English language remake of Before We Die, starring Lesley Sharp, which aired on Channel 4 in 2021. Baker wrote two further remake series, the English-language adaptations of Suspect (Danish: Forhøret), and Professor T.. On 6 October 2021, it was announced Professor T. had been renewed by ITV for a second series, which premiered on 16 September 2022. In 2023, it was renewed for a third series.

In 2022, Baker created the ITV period drama Hotel Portofino, about a family in the 1920s moving to a resort town in the Italian Riviera, while the nation is dealing with political turmoil. Baker’s love of Italy and the topicality of the historical period's political issues inspired him to create the show, workshopping characters and scenarios with Eagle Eye executives Walter Iuzzolino and Jo McGrath, who later produced the series. It would also mark Eagle Eye's first original drama commission. The show was renewed for a second season.

References

External links
 

Living people
21st-century British male writers
British television writers
British male screenwriters
Year of birth missing (living people)